Lake Chelan Airport , formerly known as Chelan Municipal Airport, is a public use airport located three nautical miles (6 km) northeast of the central business district of Chelan, a city in Chelan County, Washington, United States. The airport is owned by the City of Chelan/Port of Chelan. According to the FAA's National Plan of Integrated Airport Systems for 2009–2013, it is categorized as a general aviation facility.

Facilities and aircraft 
It has one runway designated 2/20 with an asphalt surface measuring 3,503 by 60 feet (1,068 x 18 m).

For the 12-month period ending June 30, 2009, the airport had 16,000 general aviation aircraft operations, an average of 43 per day. At that time there were 64 aircraft based at this airport: 78.1% single-engine, 4.7% multi-engine, 1.6% helicopter and 15.6% ultralight.

References

External links 
 Chelan Municipal (S10) page at Washington State DOT
 Aerial image as of 2 August 1998 from USGS The National Map

Airports in Washington (state)
Transportation buildings and structures in Chelan County, Washington